Sinan Alaağaç (May 14, 1960 – November 24, 1985) was a goalkeeper of Eskişehirspor who died in pre-season training due to heart attack.

References

Eskişehirspor footballers
1960 births
1985 deaths
Association football goalkeepers
Turkish footballers